The Brandt Mle 1935 60-mm mortar was a company-level indirect-fire weapon of the French army during the Second World War.  Designed by Edgar Brandt, it was copied by other countries, such as the United States and China, as well as purchased and built by Romania. Modified in 1944, the mortar continued to be used by France after the war until at least the 1960s.

Description
The Brandt Mle 1935 was a simple and effective weapon, consisting of a smoothbore metal tube fixed to a base plate (to absorb recoil), with a lightweight bipod mount. The team of the Mle 1935 was made of five men: a leader, a firer, an artificer and two suppliers.  When a mortar bomb was dropped into the tube, an impact-sensitive primer in the base of the bomb would make contact with a firing pin at the base of the tube, and detonate, igniting a gunpowder charge, which would propel the bomb out of the tube, and towards the target.

HE mortar bombs fired by the weapon weighed  1.33 kilograms. A French infantry company in 1940 was allocated one Mle 1935 mortar.

This weapon provided a pattern for other light mortars used during World War II. Among the best known is the U.S. 60-mm M2 mortar.  Captured examples were used by the Germans as the 6 cm Granatwerfer 225(f).

Romania also purchased and license-built the Mle 1935 mortar prior to and during the Second World War. The mortars were produced at the Voina Works in Brașov, with a production rate of 26 pieces per month as of October 1942.

Notes

References
 
 Ferrard, Stéphane. Les mortier Brandt de 60 et 81 mm dans l'Armée française en 1940.

External links
worldwar2.ro article on Brandt 60-mm mortar

World War II infantry mortars of France
60mm mortars